The Hour of Truth (Spanish: La hora de la verdad) is a 1945 Mexican drama film directed by Norman Foster and starring Ricardo Montalbán, Virginia Serret, Lilia Michel. It is set in the world of bullfighting.

Cast
 Ricardo Montalbán as Rafael Meija
 Virginia Serret as Carmela
 Lilia Michel as Elena
 Roberto Cañedo
 Mimí Derba
 Miguel Ángel Ferriz
 Antonio R. Frausto
 Miguel Inclán
 Carlos Martínez Baena
 Carlos Orellana
 Daniel Pastor
 Fernando A. Rivero
 Emma Roldán
 Virginia Zurí

References

Bibliography
 Mora, Carl J. Mexican Cinema: Reflections of a Society. University of California Press, 1989.

External links
 

1945 films
1945 drama films
Mexican drama films
1940s Spanish-language films
Films directed by Norman Foster
Mexican black-and-white films
1940s Mexican films